Good Bad Not Evil is the fourth studio album by garage rock band Black Lips. The album was recorded in December 2006 and released on September 11, 2007. The title is a reference to The Shangri-Las song, "Give Him a Great Big Kiss".. Their song "Veni Vidi Vici" samples the song "I'm Going Home" by The Swamp Rats.

Reception

Good Bad Not Evil has received generally positive reviews. On the review aggregate site Metacritic the album has a score of 73 out of 100, indicating "Generally favorable reviews."

Licensing
Several songs from Good Bad Not Evil have appeared in films. "Bad Kids" and "Veni Vidi Vici" were featured in (500) Days of Summer. "Veni Vidi Vici" was also featured in Angel Camouflaged, while "O Katrina!" was featured in Scott Pilgrim vs. the World.

Track listing

Personnel
The following people contributed to Good Bad Not Evil:

Black Lips
 Cole Alexander
 Joe Bradley
 Ian St. Pe
 Jared "Hondo" Swilley

Additional personnel
 Jiro Bevis - Illustrations
 Black Lips - Audio Production
 Justin McNeight - Audio Engineer
 Dan Monick - Photography
 Edward Rawls - Audio Engineer, Engineer
 Noel Summerville - Mastering
 Chris "Box" Taylor - Artwork, Design

Charts

References

Black Lips albums
2007 albums
Vice Records albums
In the Red Records albums